The Formula Regional European Championship by Alpine (FRECA) is a FIA-certified regional European Formula 3 racing series. On 12 October 2018 it was announced that the Italian autosport regulator Automobile Club d’Italia (ACI) and karting promoter WSK would organize the inaugural year of the championship in 2019. Their bid was chosen over Renault Sport's bid with the same chassis, who attracted fewer votes from Single-Seater Commission members. Following the 2020 season, the Formula Renault Eurocup merged with the Formula Regional European Championship to become the Formula Regional European Championship by Alpine.

The championship's first season featured eight rounds on the circuits across Europe with half of them in Italy.

The driver champions receive FIA Super License points. The series is intended to be a stepping stone between Formula 4 and the international FIA Formula 3 Championship.

Car
The championship features Tatuus-designed and built cars. The cars will be constructed out of carbon fibre and feature a monocoque chassis which feature a number of enhanced safety features including the new Halo device and improved side impact protection, and will have a six-speed paddle-shift sequential gearbox. In the 2019 and 2020 seasons, the car was powered by a Alfa Romeo 270PS (200kW) turbo engine tuned by Autotecnica. After the merge with Formula Renault Eurocup for the 2021 season the championship uses Renault engines.

Champions

Drivers'

Teams'

Rookie

Drivers graduated to FIA Formula 2/3 Championship 

* Season still in progress.

Notes:

 Gold background denotes Formula Regional European champion.

Circuits 
 Bold denotes a circuit will be used in the 2023 season.

References

External links
 Formula Regional European Championship Official Website

European auto racing series
Recurring sporting events established in 2019
2019 establishments in Europe
Formula racing series
Formula Regional European Championship